This is a list of current and defunct automobile manufacturers and brand names of China.

State-owned manufacturers

 Beijing Automotive Industry Holding Corporation (BAIC) (1988–present)
Arcfox
Beijing (Previously Senova)
Beijing Off-road
BAW (1958–present)
Foton (1996–present)
Changhe
Beijing Hyundai (Joint venture with Hyundai Motor Company)
Beijing Benz (Joint venture with Daimler AG)
BAIC Yinxiang (Joint venture with Yinxiang Group)
Brilliance Auto Group (1992–present)
Jinbei  (1991–present)
Zhonghua (2002–present)
Brilliance BMW (Joint venture with BMW)
Zinoro (2013–present)
Chang'an Motors (1990–present)
Changan
Oshan
Kaicene
Avatr (2021–present)
Changan Ford (Joint venture with Ford Motor Company)
Changan Mazda (Joint venture with Mazda)
Chery (1997–present)
Karry
Exeed
Jetour
Dongfeng (1969–present)
 Aeolus (Dongfeng Fengshen) (2009–present)
Venucia (2010–present)
Voyah
Skio
DFSK (Joint venture with Sokon Group) 
Dongfeng Nissan (Joint venture with Nissan)
Dongfeng Honda (Joint venture with Honda)
Luxgen (Dongfeng Yulon) (Joint venture with Yulon)
First Automobile Works  (1953–present)
Bestune
Hongqi (1958–present)
Senia
Haima Automobile (1992–present)
FAW Tianjin (Junpai) (1965–present)
FAW-Volkswagen (Joint venture with Volkswagen Group)
FAW-Toyota (Joint venture with Toyota)
Fujian Motors Group
Soueast (1995–present)
Yudo
Keyton
GAC Group (1955–present)
Aion (2018–present)
Trumpchi (2010–present)
Changfeng Motor (Leopaard) (1950–present)
Gonow
Guangqi Honda (1998–present) (Joint venture with Honda) 
Everus (2008–present)
GAC Toyota (2004–present) (Joint venture with Toyota) 
Leahead (2015–present)
JAC Motors (Anhui Jianghuai) (1964–present)
Refine
Sehol (Joint venture with Volkswagen Group)
Jiangling Motor Holding (2004–present)
Jiangling (JMC) (1993–present)
JMC Yusheng
JMC Ford (Joint venture with Ford Motor Company)
Landwind (2004–present)
 JMCG (1947–present)
 Jingma Motor (1958–present)
 JMCGL (2013–present)
 JMEV (2015–present) (Joint venture with Renault)
SAIC Motor (1955–present)
Maxus (2011–present)
MG Motor (2006–present)
Nanjing Automobile Corporation (NAC) (1947–present)
Yuejin (1995–present)
Roewe (2006–present)
IM Motors
SAIC-GM (Joint venture with General Motors)
SAIC-GM-Wuling (1958–present) (Joint venture with General Motors and Wuling Motors)
Baojun
SAIC Volkswagen (Joint venture with Volkswagen Group)

Independent manufacturers 
Aiways (2017–present)
BYD (2003–present)
Denza (2010–present) (Joint venture with Daimler AG)
Foday (1988–present)
Geely (1998–present)
Farizon
Geometry
Lotus
Lynk & Co (2016–present)
Maple
Polestar
Radar
Volvo Cars (2010–present)
Zeekr
Zhidou
Jidu Auto (Joint venture with Baidu)
Great Wall Motors (1984–present)
Haval (2013–present)
TANK (2021–present)
ORA (2018–present)
WEY (2017–present)
SG Automotive (1984–present)
Huanghai
Hawtai (Huatai) (2000–present)
Heibao Auto (1990–present)
HiPhi (Human Horizons) (2017–present)
King Long (1988–present)
Leapmotor (2016–present)
Fujian New Forta (2001–present)
Li Auto (2015–present)
Lifan (1992–present)
Nio (2014–present)
Neta (Hozon Auto) (2014–present)
Shaanxi Automobile Group (1968–present)
Shandong Heibao (1990–present)
Sichuan Tengzhong (2005–present)
Sinomach
Zedriv (2017–present)
SiTech (2018–present) 
Shuguang Group (1984–present)
Huanghai Bus (1951–present)
Skywell 
Skyworth Auto
Nanjing Golden Dragon Bus
Soar Automotive (1991–present)
Sokon (1986–present)
Seres (2016–present)
Suda (2010–present)
Sunlong Bus (2001–present)
Tangjun Ou Ling
Tianma (1995–present)
Techrules (2016–present)
Tengzhong (2005–present)
Wanshan Special Vehicle
Wanxiang (1969–present)
Weltmeister (2015–present)
Wuling Automobile (2007–present)
Wuzhoulong (2000–present)
Xinkai (1984–present)
XPeng (2014–present)
Yema Auto (1994–present)
Yutong Group (1963–present)
ZX Auto (1999–present)
Zhongyu Auto (2004–present)

Former manufacturers

Anda'er (1991–2016)
Bamin (1980's–2010)
Baolong (1998–2005)
Binzhou Pride (2006–2008)
Bordrin (2016–2021; went bankrupt due to the COVID-19 pandemic)
Byton (2016–2021)
Changfeng Motor
Dadi Auto (1988–2012; bought by CHTC)
Datong (1954–2000's; acquired by FAW)
Yungang (1989–2000's; acquired by FAW)
Disai (1989–1996)
Dorcen (2018–2021)
Emgrand (2009–2014; subsidiary of Geely Auto, rolled back into Geely)
Fuzhou Automobile Works (1956–1984)
Fuzhou Automotive Industry Corporation (1984–1990)
Forta (1990–2001) (became New Forta)
Fuqi (1969–2013)
Fuxing (1994–1998)
Guizhou Yunque (1989–2005)
Gonow (2003–2016)
Green Field Motor (2010–2016)
Greentech Automotive (2009–2018)
Hafei (1950–2015)
Hanjiang (car manufacturer under Tonghui Machinery Works until 2005; acquired by Gonow)
Hongxing (1960–2004; acquired by Shuanghuan)
Huali (1984–2002)
Huayang (1990's–2004; acquired by Lifan Group)
Liming (1986–2001)
Nanjing Yuejin Soyat (1999–2007)
National Electric Vehicle Experimental & Demonstration Area (NEVEDA) (1995–2004)
Nushen (1990–2001; currently a subsidiary of JAC Motors) 
Polarsun Automobile (2003–2018)
Riich (2009–2013; subsidiary of Chery)
Sanxing (1990–2002)
Shanlu Motors (1991–2001)
Shuanghuan Auto (1988–2016)
Shenyang Heibao (2001–2005)
Tianju Automobile (1987–2011)
Yemingzhu (1988–2011)
Tongtian (2002–2005)
Xiali (1997–2015)
Oley (2012–2015)
Yangchang Motors (1958–1993; sold to Guangzhou Automobile Industry Group in 2009)
Ycaco (1987–1993; Joint-venture with the Jiangxi Automobile Manufacturing Plant producing Isuzu trucks)
Yemingzhu (1987–2011)
Youngman (2001–2019)
Zotye (2005–2021)
Traum (2017–2021)
Domy Auto (2015–2021)
Jiangnan Automobile (2006–2021)
Qoros (2013–2022)

Joint ventures 
In the past, a foreign car manufacturer had to pair with a local car company to produce cars locally, and was allowed at most 2 joint ventures in China. This restriction is to be loosened by 2022, and is already loosened for 'new energy' vehicle corporations. Volkswagen, for example, has already established three joint ventures (being FAW, SAIC and JAC).

Below is a list of major car company joint ventures ever existed in Mainland China (truck and coach JVs not included). Early 1980s-90s CKD assembly agreements are not included as the production numbers are typically negligible compared to later JV efforts. Technology transfer agreements to domestic brands are also not included.

Current and Defunct Global Car Manufacturer Joint Ventures in Mainland China 
 Volkswagen Auto Group (Germany)
 FAW-VW (with FAW)
 SAIC-VW (with SAIC)
 Volkswagen Anhui (with JAC)
 General Motors (USA)
 SAIC-GM (with SAIC)
 SAIC-GM-Wuling (with Wuling, SAIC)
 (Defunct) FAW-GM (with FAW)
 (Defunct) Jinbei GM (with Brilliance Auto Group) (Sold to SAIC)
 Ford (USA)
 Changan Ford (with Changan)
 Jiangling Ford (with Jiangling Motors)
 Stellantis (Global)
 Dongfeng PSA (with Dongfeng)
 (Defunct) GAC FCA (with GAC) 
 (Defunct) Changan PSA (with Changan) (Sold to Baoneng)
 (Defunct) Guangzhou Peugeot (with GAC) (Stakes taken by Honda) 
 (Defunct) Nanjing Fiat (with Nanjing Auto (Merged to SAIC)
 (Defunct) Beijing Jeep (taken by Daimler)
 Renault-Nissan-Mitsubishi (France, Japan)
 GAC Mitsubishi (with GAC)
 Renault Brilliance / Jinbei (with Brilliance Auto Group)
 Dongfeng Nissan (with Dongfeng)
 Zhengzhou Nissan (with Dongfeng)
 (Defunct) Dongfeng Renault
 (Defunct) Soueast (Mitsubishi, in conjunction with Taiwan's CMC. Foreign maker quit JV)
 Toyota (Japan)
 FAW Toyota (with FAW) (Consolidated from Tianjin and Sichuan JV) 
 GAC Toyota (with GAC)
 (Defunct) FAW (Jilin) Daihatsu (with FAW)
 Mercedes-Benz Group (Germany)
 Beijing Benz (with BAIC)
 Fujian Benz (with BAIC, Fujian Motors)
 Smart (with Geely)
 Honda (Japan)
 Dongfeng Honda (with Dongfeng)
 Guangzhou Honda (with GAC)
 Hyundai-Kia (South Korea)
 Dongfeng Yueda Kia (with Dongfeng, in conjunction with Yueda Investments)
 Beijing Hyundai (with BAIC)
 Suzuki (Japan)
 (Defunct) Changan Suzuki (with Changan)
 Isuzu (Japan)
 Jiangxi Isuzu (with Jiangling)
 Qingling Motors (with Qingling)
 Mazda (Japan)
 Changan Mazda (with Changan)
 (Defunct) Hainan Mazda (with FAW) (Remaining rights went to Haima, not associated to FAW)
 (Defunct) FAW Car-Mazda (with FAW) (sold to Changan),
 BMW (Germany)
 BMW Brilliance (with Brilliance Auto Group)
 Tata Group (India, UK)
 Chery Jaguar Land Rover (with Chery)

 Tesla is currently the only foreign car manufacturer that exclusively owns a factory in Mainland China, instead of having a joint venture with or being a subsidiary of any local auto company. Their sole factory is located in Shanghai.

See also
Automotive industry in China
List of automobile manufacturers
List of Asian automobile manufacturers
List of automobile marques

References 

Lists of automobile manufacturers
Cars
Manufacturing in China